Red Rock Township may refer to:

Canada 
 Red Rock, Ontario

United States 

 Red Rock Township, Marion County, Iowa, in Marion County, Iowa
 Red Rock Township, Mower County, Minnesota
 Red Rock Township, Minnehaha County, South Dakota, in Minnehaha County, South Dakota

Township name disambiguation pages